Table game may refer to:

 Table game (casino), games of chance that are played against the casino and operated by one or more live dealers
 Tables game, a class of board game that includes backgammon
 Tabletop game, games that are normally played on a table or other flat surface

See also
Table football
Table hockey
Table squash
Table tennis